Bela Voda may refer to the following villages in Serbia:
 Bela Voda (Kruševac)
 Bela Voda (Prokuplje)